Richard Joseph Giordano (July 20, 1932 – March 27, 2010) was an American comics artist and editor whose career included introducing Charlton Comics' "Action Heroes" stable of superheroes and serving as executive editor of DC Comics.

Early life
Dick Giordano, an only child, was born in New York City on July 20, 1932, in the borough of Manhattan to Josephine Labruzzi and Graziano "Jack" Giordano. He attended the School of Industrial Art.

Career

Charlton Comics
Beginning as a freelance artist at Charlton Comics in 1952, Giordano contributed artwork to dozens of the company's comics, including such Western titles as Annie Oakley, Billy the Kid, and Wyatt Earp, the war comic Fightin' Army, and scores of covers.

Giordano's artwork from Charlton's Strange Suspense Stories was used as inspiration for artist Roy Lichtenstein's 1965/1966 Brushstroke series, including Brushstroke, Big Painting No. 6, Little Big Painting and Yellow and Green Brushstrokes.

By the mid-1960s a Charlton veteran, Giordano rose to executive editor, succeeding Pat Masulli, by 1965. As an editor, he made his first mark in the industry, overseeing Charlton's revamping of its few existing superheroes and having his artists and writers create new such characters for what he called the company's "Action Hero" line. Many of these artists included new talent Giordano brought on board, including Jim Aparo, Dennis O'Neil, and Steve Skeates.

DC Comics
DC Comics vice president Irwin Donenfeld hired Giordano as an editor in April 1968, at the suggestion of Steve Ditko, with Giordano bringing over to DC some of the creators he had nurtured at Charlton. Giordano was given several titles such as Teen Titans, Aquaman and Young Love, but none of DC's major series. He launched the horror comics series The Witching Hour in March 1969. and the Western series All-Star Western vol. 2 in September 1970.

He continued to freelance for DC as a penciler and inker. As an artist, Giordano was best known as an inker. His inking was particularly associated with the pencils of Neal Adams, for their run in the early 1970s on the titles Batman and Green Lantern/Green Arrow. Comics historian Les Daniels observed that "The influential Adams style moved comics closer to illustration than cartooning, and he brought a menacing mood to Batman's adventures that was augmented by Dick Giordano's dark, brooding inks."

Continuity Associates
By 1971, frustrated by what he felt was a lack of editorial opportunities, Giordano had left DC to partner with fellow artist Neal Adams for their Continuity Associates studios, which served as an art packager for comic book publishers, including such companies as Giordano's former employer Charlton Comics, Marvel Comics, and the one-shot Big Apple Comix. Several comics artists began their careers at Continuity and many were mentored by Giordano during their time there.

He had a brief run as penciler of the Wonder Woman series which included a two-issue story in issues #202–203 (October and December 1972) written by science-fiction author Samuel R. Delany. Giordano drew several backup stories in Action Comics featuring the Human Target character as well as the martial arts feature "Sons of the Tiger" in Marvel's black-and-white comics magazine The Deadly Hands of Kung Fu. He was a frequent artist on Batman and Detective Comics and he and writer Denny O'Neil created the Batman supporting character Leslie Thompkins in the story "There Is No Hope in Crime Alley" in Detective Comics #457 (March 1976). Giordano inked the large-format, first DC/Marvel intercompany crossover, Superman vs. the Amazing Spider-Man (1976), over the pencils of Ross Andru. Giordano inked Adams on the one-shot Superman vs. Muhammad Ali in 1978. Throughout the late 1970s and the early 1980s, Ross Andru and Giordano were DC's primary cover artists, providing cover artwork for the Superman titles as well as covers for many of the other comics in the DC line at that time.

Return to DC
In 1980, DC publisher Jenette Kahn brought Giordano back to DC. Initially the editor of the Batman titles, Giordano was named the company's new managing editor in 1981, and promoted to vice president/executive editor in 1983, a position he held until 1993. DC Comics writer and executive Paul Levitz observed in 2010 that "Giordano held the respect of talent as one of their own, and kept their affection with his reassuring calm and warmth."

Giordano provided art for several anniversary issues of key DC titles. He and television writer Alan Brennert crafted the story "To Kill a Legend" in Detective Comics #500 (March 1981). Giordano was one of the artists on the double-sized Justice League of America #200 (March 1982) as well as Wonder Woman #300 (Feb. 1983). He was promoted to Vice-President/Executive Editor in 1984, and with Kahn and Levitz, oversaw the relaunch of all of DC's major characters with the Crisis on Infinite Earths limited series in 1985. This was followed by Frank Miller's Batman: The Dark Knight Returns and Alan Moore and Dave Gibbons' Watchmen in 1986. Giordano inked several major projects during this time such as George Pérez's pencils on Crisis on Infinite Earths and John Byrne's pencils on The Man of Steel and Action Comics, though during this period he always employed assistants for inking backgrounds, filling in large black areas, and making final erasures.

From 1983 to 1987, Giordano wrote a monthly column published in DC titles called "Meanwhile..." which much like Marvel's "Bullpen Bulletins" featured news and information about the company and its creators. Unlike "Bullpen Bulletins," which was characterized by an ironic, over-hyped tone, Giordano's columns ". . . were written in a relatively sober, absolutely friendly voice, like a friend of your father's you particularly liked and didn't mind sitting down to listen to." Giordano closed each "Meanwhile..." column with the characteristic words, "Thank you and good afternoon."

The Vertigo imprint was launched in early 1993 built upon the success of several titles edited by Karen Berger including Swamp Thing, Hellblazer, Sandman, Doom Patrol, Animal Man, and Shade, the Changing Man. Giordano inked six issues of The Sandman in 1991–1993.

Creators' rights
Beginning in 1987, Giordano was in the middle of an industry-wide debate about the comics industry, ratings systems, and creators' rights. Veteran writers Mike Friedrich, Steven Grant, and Roger Slifer all cited Giordano in particular for his hard-line stance on behalf of DC. This debate led in part to the 1988 drafting of the Creator's Bill of Rights.

Later career

Giordano left DC in 1993, and still did the occasional inking job, but later returned to freelancing full-time. In 1994 Giordano illustrated a graphic novel adaptation of the novel Modesty Blaise released by DC Comics, with creator/writer Peter O'Donnell. He was one of the many artists who contributed to the Superman: The Wedding Album one-shot in 1996 wherein the title character married Lois Lane.

In 2002, Giordano launched the short-lived Future Comics with writer David Michelinie and artist Bob Layton. Since 2002, Giordano had drawn several issues of The Phantom published in Europe and Australia. In 2004, Giordano and writer Roy Thomas completed an adaptation of Bram Stoker's Dracula novel. They had begun the project in 1974 but the cancellation of many of Marvel's black and white magazines put it into limbo. The finished story was collected into a hardcover edition in 2005 and a colorized hardcover edition in 2010. In 2005, F+W Publications Inc. published the instructional art book Drawing Comics with Dick Giordano, which he wrote and illustrated. His last mainstream work appeared in Jonah Hex vol. 2, #51 (March 2010) for which he drew the interior art and the cover. His last comics work was pencilling and editing Baron Five, published by Hound Comics.

Personal life
Giordano married the former Marie Trapani, sister of fellow comics artist Sal Trapani, on April 17, 1955. She died from complications of her second stomach cancer surgery in February 1993. They had three children together; Lisa, Dawn, and Richard Jr. Marie's death, combined with Giordano's increasing hearing loss, hastened his decision to retire from DC. Following the death of his wife, Giordano split time between homes in Florida and Connecticut. In 1995, he moved to Palm Coast, Florida, where he continued to work full-time freelancing, until his death. Giordano had suffered from lymphoma and later from leukemia, secondary to the chemotherapy. He died on March 27, 2010 due to complications of treatment for leukemia.

Legacy
Giordano served as mentor or inspiration to a generation of inkers, including Terry Austin, Mike DeCarlo, and Bob Layton.

Shortly after Giordano's death in 2010, The Hero Initiative created "The Dick Giordano Humanitarian of the Year Award", which debuted at the 2010 Harvey Awards ceremony held at the Baltimore Comic-Con. The award recognizes one person in comics each year who demonstrates particular generosity and integrity in support of the overall comic book community.

Awards
Giordano received recognition in the industry for his work, including the Alley Award for Best Editor in 1969. He won the Shazam Award for Best Inker (Dramatic Division) in 1970 (for Green Lantern), 1971, 1973 (for Justice League of America), and 1974. He won the 1971 Goethe Award for "Favorite Pro Editor." Giordano received an Inkpot Award in 1981. In 2009 he was awarded the Inkwell Awards Joe Sinnott Hall of Fame Award.

Bibliography
Comics work (interior full art – pencils and inks, except where noted) includes:

Archie Comics
Archie's Super Hero Comics Digest Magazine (Black Hood) #2 (inks over Neal Adams) (1979)
Chilling Adventures in Sorcery #4 (1973)

Charlton Comics
Brides in Love #1 (1956)
Love Diary #1–3, 6, 10, 21, 23–24, 31–32 (1958–1964)
Judomaster #91–98 (Sarge Steel backup stories) (1966–1967)
Sarge Steel #1–4, 7 (1964–1966)
Secret Agent #10 (Sarge Steel backup story) (1967)

DC Comics

Action Comics (Human Target) #419–420, 422–423, 425–426, 428–429, 432, 641; (Green Arrow) #421, 424, 426, 428, 431; (Atom) #427, 430, 433, 435; (Superman) #509 (inks over Jim Starlin pencils), #584–590, 600 (inks over John Byrne), #723 (inks over various pencilers), #836 (pencils, among other artists) (1972–2006)
Action Comics Annual #1 (inks over Arthur Adams) (1987)
Adventure Comics (Supergirl) #405, 408–409 (inks over Mike Sekowsky); (Zatanna) #419; (Deadman) #462, 465 (inks over Jose Luis Garcia-Lopez); (Aquaman) #475–478 (1971–1980)
Adventures in the DC Universe Annual (Rose and Thorn and Zatanna) #1 (1997)
All New Collectors' Edition #C-56 (inks over Neal Adams), C-58 (inks over Rich Buckler) (1978)
American Century #7 (2001)
Armageddon: Inferno miniseries (JSA) #4 (1992)
Armageddon: The Alien Agenda miniseries, (Captain Atom) #4 (1992)
Atari Force #1–5 (inks over Ross Andru) (1982–1983)
Batman (Batman backup stories) #247, 250; (Batman and Robin backup story) #327; (Batman) #421 (full art); #219–222, 224–227, 235–236, 239–242, 246, 249–250, 252–254, 256–261, 266, 310 (inks over Irv Novick); #232, 234, 237, 243–245, 255 (inks over Neal Adams); #248 (inks over Bob Brown); #262–264, 267 (inks over Ernie Chan); #298–299, 302 (inks over John Calnan); #300, 312, 321 (inks over Walt Simonson); #359 (inks over Dan Jurgens); #409 (inks over Ross Andru); #497 (inks over Jim Aparo); #509 (inks over Mike Manley) (1973–1994)
The Batman Chronicles #13, 21 (1998–2000)
Batman: Dark Knight of the Round Table, miniseries, #1–2 (1998)
Batman: Gordon of Gotham, miniseries, #1–4 (1998)
Batman: Gotham Knights #19, 28 (2001–2002)
Batman: Hollywood Knight #1–3 (2001)
Batman: Turning points #3 (2001)
Birds of Prey #11–12, 18 (1999–2000)
Birds of Prey: Wolves graphic novel (1997)
Black Canary: New Wings miniseries #1–4 (over Trevor Von Eeden layouts) (1991–1992)
The Brave and the Bold (Flash and Doom Patrol) #65; (Human Target) #143–144; (Batman and Black Lightning) #163; (Batman and Black Canary) #166 (full art); #80–81, 102 (inks over Neal Adams); #87 (inks over Mike Sekowsky); (1966–1980)
Captain Action #3 (1968)
Catwoman #31–32 (1996)
Christmas with the Super-Heroes (Deadman) #2 (1988)
Crisis on Infinite Earths #1–3, 7 (inks over George Pérez) (1985)
DC Comics Presents #12, 33–34 (inks over Rich Buckler); #13–14 (inks over Dick Dillin); #26 (inks over George Pérez); #27 (inks over Jim Starlin); #31 (inks over García-López) (1979–1981)
DC Special Series #8 (inks over Ric Estrada); #15 (inks over Michael Golden); #21, 27 (inks over García-López) (1978–1981)
DC Super Stars #18 (inks over Romeo Tanghal); (1978)
DC Universe Holiday Bash #1 (inks over Paul Ryan) (1997)
Demolition Man, miniseries, #1–4 (inks over Rod Whigham) (1993)
Detective Comics (Elongated Man) #426, 430, 436, 449; (Batman) #457; (Human Target) #484, 486, 493; (Batgirl) #487; (Batman and Robin) #500 (full art); (Batman) #395, 397, 400, 402, 404, 407–408, 410 (inks over Neal Adams); #414–415, 418–419, 425, 427, 434–435 (inks over Irv Novick); #439–440 (inks over Sal Amendola); #411–413, 417, 422–424, 428 (inks over Bob Brown); #433 (inks over Dick Dillin); #447–448 (inks over Ernie Chan); #524 (inks over Don Newton); #525 (inks over Dan Jurgens); #529–530 (inks over Gene Colan); #572 (inks over Terry Beatty); #598–600 (inks over Denys Cowan); #618 (inks over Norm Breyfogle); #665 (inks over Graham Nolan) (1972–1993)
The Flash (Elongated Man) #206, 208, 210, 212; (Green Lantern) #220–221, 223–224 (1971–1973)
The Flash Annual vol. 2 #10 (1997)
The Fury of Firestorm Annual #4 (among other artists) (1986)
Green Arrow Annual #2 (1989)
Hawk and Dove #25 (among other artists) (1991)
Jonah Hex vol. 2 #51 (2010)
Jonni Thunder a.k.a. Thunderbolt, miniseries, #1–4 (1985)
Justice League of America (Wonder Woman/Zatanna) #200 (1982)
Justice League of America, vol. 4, #0 (one page only) (2006)
L.A.W., miniseries, #1–6 (1999–2000)
The Man of Steel, mini-series, #1–6 (inks over John Byrne) (1986)
Modesty Blaise, graphic novel (1994)
Nightwing: Alfred's Return, one-shot (1995)
The New Teen Titans vol. 2 (Tales of Tamaran) #16 (1986)
Power of Shazam #28; #29–36, 38–41 (inks over Peter Krause); #37 (inks over Mike Manley); #42–46, 1,000,000 (inks over Jerry Ordway) (1997–1999)
Secret Origins vol. 2 (Halo) #6 (1986)
Secret Origins of the World's Greatest Super-Heroes (Batman) (1989)
Shadowdragon Annual #1 (1995)
Shazam! #12, 25 (1974–1976)
Silver Age: Showcase (Seven Soldiers of Victory) #1 (2000)
Strange Sports Stories #2–3 (1973–1974)
Supergirl Annual #1 (1996)
Superman (Fabulous World of Krypton) #236, 255, 271 (1971–1974)
Superman Forever one-shot (among other artists) (1998)
Superman's Girl Friend, Lois Lane (Rose and Thorn) #112, 115–116 (1971)
Time Warp #1, 3 (1979–1980)
Wonder Woman #178–198 (inks over Mike Sekowsky); #199 (inks over Don Heck) #241 (inks over Joe Staton); #300 (inks over Ross Andru); #200–203, 220, 300 (full art) (1972–1983)
Wonder Woman: The Secret of the Magic Thiara (inks over Rich Buckler) (book set and record, 1978)
Wonder Woman Secret Files & Origins #1 (1998)

Notes

Marvel Comics

The Avengers vol. 3 #24, 29 (inks over George Pérez) (2000)
Bizarre Adventures #28 (inks over Larry Hama) (1981)
Conan the Barbarian #48–51 (inks over John Buscema) (1975)
Deadly Hands of Kung Fu (Sons of the Tiger) #1, 3 (1974)
Doctor Strange #1–2, 4–5 (inks over Frank Brunner) (1974)
Dracula Lives #1 (inks over Alan Weiss); #2 (inks over Gene Colan); #5–8, 10–11 (full art) (1974–1975)
The Incredible Hulk, vol. 3, #24 (inks over John Romita Jr.) (2001)
Legion of Monsters (Dracula) #1 (1975)
Love Romances #53–54, 61, 64, 75–76, 86–92, 104, 106 (1955–1963)
Love Tales #68–69 (1956)
Lovers #83 (1957)
Marvel Feature vol. 2 (Red Sonja) #1 (1975)
Marvel Premiere #14 (inks over Frank Brunner); #15 (inks over Gil Kane); #16–19 (inks over Larry Hama) (1974)
Marvel Team-Up vol. 2 #5 (inks over Tom Grindberg) (1998)
Marvel Two-in-One #15 (inks over Arvell Jones) (1976)
My Love #16 (inks over Gene Colan) (1972)
Nova #14 (inks over Sal Buscema) (1977)
Savage Sword of Conan #25 (1977)
Spider-Man Team-Up #7 (inks over Sal Buscema) (1997)
Spider-Man/Punisher #1 (1996)
Stoker's Dracula #1–4 (2004–2005)
Strange Tales #61, 172–173 (inker) (1958–1974)
Thor #231–232 (inks over John Buscema) (1975)
Thor vol. 2 #18, 23–25 (inks over John Romita Jr.) (1999–2000)
Unknown Worlds of Science Fiction #4 (1975)
Untold Tales of Spider-Man #16 (inks over Pat Olliffe) (1996)
Vampire Tales #5 (inks over Alan Kupperberg) (1974)
Worlds Unknown #4 (inks over John Buscema) (1973)

Valiant Comics
Bloodshot #0, #27–29, 32–33, 38–39 (inker) (1994–1995)
Ninjak #0, #00, #19 (inker) (1995)
Psi Lords #1–7 (inker) (1994–1995)
Solar, Man of the Atom #46–56, 59 (inker) (1995–1996)

Warren Publishing
Creepy #94 (1978)
Eerie #88 (1977)

Other publishers
Star Reach #2 (Star Reach, 1975)
Cadillacs and Dinosaurs #1–3 (Topps, 1994)

Books
Drawing Comics with Dick Giordano (F+W Publications Inc., 2005)

References

External links

 Dickgiordano.com
 
 "DC Profiles #64: Dick Giordano" at the Grand Comics Database
 Dick Giordano at Mike's Amazing World of Comics
 Dick Giordano at the Unofficial Handbook of Marvel Comics Creators
 

1932 births
2010 deaths
American business executives
American comics artists
Comic book editors
Comics inkers
Deaths from pneumonia in Florida
High School of Art and Design alumni
Inkpot Award winners
People from Manhattan
Silver Age comics creators
Will Eisner Award Hall of Fame inductees
DC Comics people
American people of Italian descent